Clarksville is an unincorporated community approximately ten kilometers northwest of the city of Marshall in east central Illinois. The village lies in on the north edge of Clark County in Dolson Township.

History

Clarksville was founded in 1851. In its heyday it hosted the usual variety of services for local farmers and other inhabitants including a blacksmith, general store, school and church. Only the latter (Clarksville Baptist Church, with a Southern Baptist affiliation) has persisted to the present day. Its century-old previous structure was recently vacated in favor of a larger new building completed in 2005. A cemetery between the two structures houses the remains of settlers and area inhabitants, some born in the 18th century.

After decades of decline as increased mobility made small local shops uncompetitive with the larger facilities in nearby towns, Clarksville is enjoying a modest resurgence in population. The damming of Mill Creek directly to the south of the village, and the establishment of an extensive county park along the lake, have created demand for several modestly upscale new subdivisions along the north edge of Mill Creek Lake. Several storage facilities provide frequent visitors to the park a means of warehousing their boats near the lake, and a small restaurant/bait shop (Mill Creek Restaurant) provides park visitors and locals with a social outlet. A local telephone cooperative provides telephone service to residents of the village and the surrounding area. Clarksville is also home to Mill Creek Mushrooms, Inc. which specializes in growing organic specialty mushrooms.

References

External links
 Clarksville History at Genealogy Trails.

Unincorporated communities in Clark County, Illinois
Unincorporated communities in Illinois
Populated places established in 1851
1851 establishments in Illinois